CunninLynguists is an American hip hop group from Lexington, Kentucky. The group currently consists of Deacon the Villain, Kno, and Natti.

Early beginnings
In 1999, Deacon the Villain and Kno met at Club Kaya in Atlanta, Georgia at an event for the now defunct Blaze Magazine that included various members of Atlanta's own Dungeon Family. They had talked online previously through an emcee named Jugga the Bully, who Deacon invited to an open mic he helped throw called "Underground Live" at the Morehouse College campus, which Deacon attended. At the time, Kno was in the group The Continuum, and Deacon was in the group Illstar. Deacon soon returned to his home state of Kentucky and Kno eventually followed. Following several conversations of working together, the two first planned an EP where Kno was only producing and Deacon was rhyming, but soon Kno contributed as an emcee as well.

Musical career

2001–2005: Will Rap for Food, SouthernUnderground and Sloppy Seconds
The group's debut studio album, Will Rap for Food, was released in October 2001, and was described by Pitchfork Media as "a solid, accessible debut, filled with clever rhymes and tremendously consistent production".

In April 2003, Mr. SOS joined the group on the album SouthernUnderground, which was independently released on Freshchest Records. The album featured guests including Masta Ace, Supastition and others, alongside production from Domingo and RJD2, but again mostly Kno. M.F. DiBella of AllMusic commented on "a lyrical deftness and genuine feel for the music rarely seen in the bling-conscious rap of the latter-day era".

The group landed a distribution contract with Caroline Distribution in 2004, and SouthernUnderground was the first project re-released after inking the deal with Will Rap For Food being re-released shortly thereafter in 2005.

Throughout 2003–2005, the group toured throughout the U.S. and Canada, appearing onstage alongside notable acts such as Nappy Roots, Cee-Lo Green of Goodie Mob and touring extensively with People Under the Stairs, Raekwon of Wu-Tang Clan and Brand Nubian.

The group also released the mixtapes Sloppy Seconds Volume One in 2003 and Sloppy Seconds Vol. 2 in 2005.

2006–2008: Mr. SOS leaves, Natti joins, A Piece of Strange and Dirty Acres
Following SouthernUnderground, Mr. SOS left the group on peaceful terms. Soon after, the two remaining members met Natti, a fellow Kentucky emcee. Deacon and Kno describe his joining as a casual process, with Natti already being featured on Sloppy Seconds Vol. 2 and being involved in Deacon's side group Kynfolk. Natti would be the final member to join the group and end its formation.

CunninLynguists released the third studio album, A Piece of Strange, on January 24, 2006, via Caroline Records and Groove Attack Distribution. It features guest spots included Cee-Lo Green, Immortal Technique and Tonedeff, among others, and is entirely produced by Kno. The album marked a significant turning point in the group's musical career, with the members turning their lyrics and music into more passionate material, and minimizing their "silliness". Hype gave the album a five star review describing it as "the best album of the last 12 months". URB gave the album four stars, describing it as "a piece of beauty, a soulful and sweeping assemblage of cuts that ride a steady wave of infectious momentum", and The A.V. Club commented on Kno's "masterful, adventurous production".

The release of A Piece of Strange also saw their profile rise and cultivating a bigger and dedicated fanbase, as they toured abroad multiple times in support of the release, appearing live alongside notable acts such as Kanye West, Pharrell Williams, and The Strokes.

CunninLynguists released their fourth studio album, Dirty Acres, on November 27, 2007, through a joint venture between their own label APOS Music and Swedish-based label Bad Taste Records. Produced entirely by Kno, it features artists such as Devin the Dude, Phonte of Little Brother and Witchdoctor, and was described by CMJ New Music Monthly as "a defiant album that questions everything, even the assumed standards of hip hop". It was lauded by Michael Kabran of PopMatters as "easily one of the best hip-hop albums of 2007 and arguably one of the best albums of the past decade". CunninLynguists made their way across the United States, Europe and Canada in support of the album, headlining the Dirty Acres Tour in 3 parts over the course of 2008.

2009–2013: Oneirology and Strange Journey Volumes One and Two
The group released two mixtapes in 2009, Strange Journey Volume One and Strange Journey Volume Two. On March 22, 2011, the group released the fifth studio album, Oneirology. HipHopDX said about the album: "This project combines creative sounds with inventive rhymes and stands as an example of how a great group can come together to craft a well-made album worthy of praise." Its concept revolves around Oneirology, the scientific study of dreams.

2014–present: Strange Journey Volume Three
In 2014, CunninLynguists released a mixtape, Strange Journey Volume Three. It was curated entirely by the group's fans who gave feedback on and suggested ideas for song concepts, features, packaging, and artwork. It features guest appearances from Aesop Rock, Del the Funky Homosapien, and Murs.

The same year, CunninLynguists' lexicon was also found to be one of the richest among rappers who perform in English.

In 2017, the group released the sixth studio album, Rose Azura Njano. It features guest appearances from Jason Coffey, Trizz, and Farah Elle.

Name
The name CunninLynguists is a play on the terms "cunnilingus" and "linguists". When the group was first forming, Deacon and Kno casually came up with the name, not intending for it to be permanent nor serious, instead only wanting listeners to not take their music as seriously as their music sounded.

In 2009, XXL included the group as having one of the worst names in hip hop.

Style
At the group's beginning, members Kno and Deacon focused on energetic wordplay and outlandish rhymes, only at times delving into deeper and more introspective material, such as "Mic Like a Memory" or "Family Ties" from Will Rap For Food. This continued up until their critically acclaimed album A Piece of Strange, which featured more serious songs, such as "Brain Cell", and playful ones, such as "Beautiful Girl". The group has been applauded for their ability to craft poetic songs that are also very musically enjoyable.

Members
Kno and Deacon the Villain are the founding members; they played on every CunninLynguists album. Kentucky-based emcee Natti has been involved in the group from November 2004 (appearing on all material since Sloppy Seconds Volume 2). Natti has released his first solo album, Still Motion, on September 24 (September 30 in CD form).

Discography

Studio albums
 Will Rap for Food (2001)
 SouthernUnderground (2003)
 A Piece of Strange (2006)
 Dirty Acres (2007)
 Oneirology (2011)
 Rose Azura Njano (2017)

Mixtapes
 Sloppy Seconds Volume One (2003)
 Sloppy Seconds Vol. 2 (2005)
 Strange Journey Volume One (2009)
 Strange Journey Volume Two (2009)
 Strange Journey Volume Three (2014)

EPs
 The WinterFire EP (2014) 
 The Rose EP (2017)
 The Azura EP (2017)

Singles
 "So Live!" (2001)
 "Seasons" (2002)
 "Dirtay" (2004)
 "Yellow Lines" (2007)
 "Mexico" b/w "Wonderful" (2007)
 "Never Come Down (The Brownie Song)" (2009)
 "Don't Leave (When Winter Comes)" (2009)
 "Stars Shine Brightest (in the Darkest of Nights)" (2012)
 "Oh Honey" (2017)

References

External links
 
 

Alternative hip hop groups
American hip hop groups
American musical trios
Musical groups from Kentucky
Musical groups established in 2000